The model 1805 U.S. Marshal "Harper's Ferry" flintlock pistol, manufactured at the Harpers Ferry Armory in Virginia (now West Virginia), was the first pistol manufactured by an American national armory. It was the standard handgun of the US dragoons during the War of 1812.

Specifications
The Model 1805 horse pistol was copied from the French Pistolet Modele An. IX of 1798.  Harper's Ferry models 1805, 1806, 1807 and 1808 flintlock pistols were all identical and there were no changes in design during this model year sequence. The M1805 pistol was a .54 caliber, single-shot, smoothbore, flintlock pistol intended for field duty. Pistols made for officers resembled the standard horse pistol but featured more elaborate decoration, and sometimes a rifled barrel. Harper's Ferry model 1805–1808 flintlock pistols were known then as “horsemen’s pistols” and were produced in pairs; both pistols having identical serial numbers. With just one shot readily available without reloading, a pair or "brace" was the standard issue. Horse accouterments also included a standard pair of saddle holsters. No serial number higher than 2048 has ever been discovered—and that is exactly half of the number recorded as produced at the Harper's Ferry Armory. There are between 200–300 of these pistols known to exist today.

War of 1812
During the War of 1812, the M1805 pistol was issued to American cavalry. Due to the high demand for weapons, derivative pistols were manufactured in other states, especially Pennsylvania and Connecticut. Some featured improvements such as iron instead of wood ramrods. President Jackson favored the M1805 throughout his military career, and used a pair of these pistols in his famous duel with Charles Dickinson in 1806.

Later developments

Improved models of the Harpers Ferry pistol were produced in 1812, 1818, and 1835. These were the first standardised pistols issued to the US Marshals after the War of 1812, and to the Texas Rangers before the Texan War of Independence. 

A caplock conversion of the M1835 pistol was issued to the US Cavalry during the Seminole War and US-Mexican War until the Colt Dragoon revolver was introduced in 1847. The last Harpers Ferry pistol was the Model 1855, a .58 caliber handgun with a detachable shoulder stock designed for use by US dragoons during the Indian Wars.

Harpers Ferry pistols were widely used by gunfighters and mountain men in the early days of the Old West, including Kit Carson. Many were also issued to the Confederate army during the American Civil War. Lawrence O'Bryan Branch was carrying a pair of M1835 pistols when he was killed by a Union army sniper in 1862.

Modern use
Currently manufactured reproductions of the original pistols are made with a larger caliber than the original, as well as a rifled bore for more accurate shooting. There is one reproduction available modeled after the percussion converted Harper's Ferry pistols that is built with the correct .54 caliber smooth bore as well. 

The model 1805–1808 U.S. Marshal "Harper's Ferry" flintlock pistol is used today on the insignia of the U.S. Army Military Police Corps.

References

External links
 M1805 pistol at the National Rifle Association's National Firearms Museum

Single-shot pistols
Black-powder pistols
Pistols of the United States
Guns of the American West
Virginia in the War of 1812
War of 1812
American Civil War weapons
Weapons and ammunition introduced in 1805